Kotiate is a type of traditional hand weapon of the Māori, the indigenous people of New Zealand.

A kotiate is a short club normally made of wood or whalebone. Kotiate means to cut or divide the liver (koti = cut in two or divide; ate = liver), is probably taken from its shape, which resembles the lobed part of the human liver.

See also
Mere (weapon)
Pouwhenua  
Tewhatewha
Patu
Taiaha
Wahaika

References

External links
Kotiate in the collection of the Museum of New Zealand Te Papa Tongarewa

Clubs (weapon)
Māori weapons
Ceremonial weapons